Philip Philipse (1724–1768) was the second son of Frederick Philipse II, 2nd Lord of Philipsburg Manor of Westchester County, New York. He was, along with his sisters Susanna (1727–1822), Mary (1730–1825), and Margaret (1733-1752), a one-quarter heir to the roughly  "Highland Patent" of his father (later to become known as the Philipse Patent, and in time today's Putnam County of southeastern New York).

Margaret died intestate, and her share was equally divided among her named living siblings.  A redistribution of the land among them was done in 1754.

Philip's elder brother, Frederick Philipse III (1720–1785), inherited the family's vast 52,000 acre hereditary estate in lower Westchester County, New York, Philipsburg Manor, and was its third and last Lord.

All the Philipses were Loyalists during the Revolutionary War and had their lands seized in 1779 by the Revolutionary government of the Province of New York.  Though never compensated for their losses by the Colonial government, various family members did receive payments from the British government in following years.

See also
 Philipse family
 Philip Philipse (1663–1699), his grandfather
 Philipse Patent
 Dutchess County Land Patents
 The Oblong

References

External links
 Putnam's Past
 Boundary Changes of Putnam County

1724 births
1768 deaths
American members of the Dutch Reformed Church
American people of Dutch descent
People of the Province of New York
Philip 1724